Elżbieta Kowalska (born 1 June 1944), née Kłaput, later Lipska, is a Polish chess player who won the Polish Women's Chess Championship in 1967.

Chess career
In the 1960s and 1970s Elżbieta Kowalska was one of the leading Polish women chess players. From 1964 to 1983 she played 15 times in the Polish Women's Chess Championship finals. 
Her greatest success was achieved in 1967 in Kielce, when she won the tournament. She also won 11 gold medals (1966, 1968, 1970 , 1973, 1974 , 1975, 1976 , 1977 , 1979, 1981 , 1983) in the Polish Team Chess Championships. In 1979 she won the Swiss-system tournament in Warsaw (before Agnieszka Brustman). In the 1994 international tournament in Wisła Elżbieta Kowalska beat WGM Marta Litinskaya.

References

External links
 
 
 

1944 births
Polish female chess players
Chess Woman FIDE Masters
Living people